Sydney is an electoral district of the Legislative Assembly of the Australian state of New South Wales in Inner Sydney. It includes the Sydney CBD; the suburbs and localities of Barangaroo, Broadway, Chinatown, Darling Harbour, Darlinghurst, Dawes Point, Elizabeth Bay, Haymarket, Millers Point, Paddington, Potts Point, Pyrmont, The Rocks, Woolloomooloo, Wynyard; and parts of Edgecliff, Rushcutters Bay, Surry Hills, Ultimo and Woollahra.

Independent Alex Greenwich has represented the seat since the 2012 Sydney by-election, triggered by the resignation of previous independent Clover Moore, who was the Lord Mayor of Sydney, due to introduced state laws preventing dual membership of state parliament and local council.

History
In the first Parliament of the New South Wales colony, 1856–57, there was a four-member electoral district called Sydney City with voters casting four votes, and the four leading candidates being elected. In 1859, it was replaced by the four-member districts of East Sydney and West Sydney. In 1894, the three four-member districts of East Sydney, West Sydney and South Sydney (created in 1880) were replaced by ten single-member districts with "Sydney" in their title: Sydney-Belmore, Sydney-Bligh, Sydney-Cook, Sydney-Denison, Sydney-Fitzroy, Sydney-Flinders, Sydney-Gipps, Sydney-King, Sydney-Lang, Sydney-Phillip and Sydney-Pyrmont. From 1904, these electorates were renamed or abolished.

In 1920, the inner-city electoral districts of Belmore, Darlinghurst, King, Paddington, Phillip and Surry Hills were combined to create a new incarnation of Sydney, which elected five members by proportional representation. This was replaced by the single member electorates of King, Paddington, Phillip and Surry Hills for the 1927 election. Central Sydney subsequently fell within a number of successive electorates, including Elizabeth and Port Jackson.

Sydney was recreated for the 2007 election, replacing abolished district Bligh and also taking in the Sydney CBD and Pyrmont that were previously in Port Jackson (the remainder of Port Jackson became the Electoral district of Balmain).

From 1920 to 1927 the district included Lord Howe Island, which was transferred from and to the electorate of King. As part of the redistribution of electoral districts for the 2023 state election, a proposal was received to move Lord Howe Island back into the electorate of Sydney. However, the NSW Electoral Commission eventually decided to retain the island within the electorate of Port Macquarie, which has included the island since 1991.

Members for Sydney

Election results

References

External links

Electoral districts of New South Wales
1920 establishments in Australia
Sydney
1927 disestablishments in Australia
Sydney
2007 establishments in Australia
Sydney